Celio may refer to:

People
Elton Divino Celio (born 1987), Brazilian football player known as Eltinho
Enrico Celio (1889-1980), Swiss politician
Gaspare Celio (1571-1640), Italian painter 
Nello Celio (1914-1995), Swiss politician

Places in Italy
Caelian Hill (Italian Celio), one of the Seven Hills of Rome
Celio, Lazio, a rione in the City of Rome

Other
Celio (retailer), French clothing retailer
Celio Technology Corporation